Mattias Eriksson (born 17 November 1981 in Sundsvall, Medelpad) is a Swedish archer.

Eriksson competed at the 2004 Summer Olympics in men's individual archery. He was defeated in the first round of elimination, being placed 39th overall. Later Eriksson was a member of the 9th-place Swedish men's archery team.

Previously he competed at the 2000 Summer Olympics, where he was placed 42nd.

References

1981 births
Living people
People from Sundsvall
Swedish male archers
Archers at the 2000 Summer Olympics
Archers at the 2004 Summer Olympics
Olympic archers of Sweden
Sportspeople from Västernorrland County
20th-century Swedish people
21st-century Swedish people